Labeobarbus tropidolepis is a species of ray-finned fish in the  family Cyprinidae.
It is found in Burundi and Tanzania where it is endemic to the Lake Tanganyika basin. 
Its natural habitats are rivers, freshwater lakes, freshwater marshes, and inland deltas.
It is not considered a threatened species by the IUCN.

References

tropidolepis
Fish described in 1900
Fish of Lake Tanganyika
Taxa named by George Albert Boulenger
Taxonomy articles created by Polbot